The 1999–2000 Midland Football Alliance season was the sixth in the history of Midland Football Alliance, a football competition in England.

Clubs and league table
The league featured 19 clubs from the previous season, along with three new clubs:
Bloxwich Town, relegated from the Southern Football League
Cradley Town, promoted from the West Midlands (Regional) League
Oadby Town, promoted from the Leicestershire Senior League

League table

References

External links
 Midland Football Alliance

1999–2000
8